Clogher was a borough constituency in the Irish House of Commons until 1800. It represented the "city" of Clogher in County Tyrone. The city, actually no more than a village, gained its importance as the site of the cathedral of the Church of Ireland diocese of Clogher. The constituency was a rotten borough in the gift of the bishop. When the constituency was disestablished, bishop John Porter's claim for £15,000 compensation was disallowed.

Members of Parliament, 1264–1801

Notes

References

 Parliamentary Memoirs of Fermanagh and Tyrone, from 1613 to 1885

Bibliography

Constituencies of the Parliament of Ireland (pre-1801)
Historic constituencies in County Tyrone
1264 establishments in Ireland
1800 disestablishments in Ireland
Constituencies established in 1264
Constituencies disestablished in 1800